Binedaline (also called binodaline or binedaline hydrochloride;) is a drug that was investigated as an antidepressant in the 1980s but was never marketed. It acts as a selective norepinephrine reuptake inhibitor (Ki = 25 nM), with relatively insignificant influence on the serotonin (Ki = 847 nM) and dopamine (Ki >= 2 μM) transporters. It has negligible affinity for the α-adrenergic, mACh, H1, or 5-HT2 receptors.

Synthesis

Grignard reaction of 2-aminobenzophenone [2835-77-0] (1) with methylmagnesium bromide and dehydration of the tertiary carbinol gives 2-(1-phenylvinyl)aniline [64097-92-3] (2). In an example of the Widman‐Stoermer Synthesis, treatment with nitrous acid followed by basification of the diazonium species with ammonia causes an intramolecular cyclization to afford 4-phenylcinnoline [21874-06-6] (3). Hydrogenation would give 4-Phenyl-1,4-dihydrocinnoline, CID:14175750 (4). The presence of acetic acid gives (5). The reaction with Methyl p-toluenesulfonate [80-48-8] leads to CID:20337750 (6). Acid hydrolysis gives  [57647-15-1] (7). Sodamide is then used to abstract the amine proton; alkylation of then anionic species with 2-dimethylaminoethylchloride [107-99-3] (8) then concludes the synthesis of binedaline (9).

See also
Widman‐Stoermer Synthesis also used for the synthesis of Cintazone [2056-56-6].

References 

Indoles
Dimethylamino compounds
Abandoned drugs